Edward T. Robertson & Son (ETR) was a multinational company in the cotton industry that existed from 1906 to 1993. It was established in Bremen as a cotton controlling company by Edward Twells Robertson (1853–1914) of Charleston, South Carolina and his son, also named Edward Twells Robertson (b. 1885), who had moved to Bremen in 1905 following the marriage of his sister Mary to the leading Bremen cotton merchant Carl Albrecht in 1902. The company opened branches in several countries and became one of the largest firms in the international cotton trade. The North Carolina government noted in 1953 that "to the world's cotton trade, Edward T. Robertson & Son stands in relatively the same position as Tiffany to the jewelry business. It is virtually a household word." As late as 1983 it was described as the leading cotton controlling company of the time.

References

Manufacturing companies established in 1906
Manufacturing companies disestablished in 1993
German companies established in 1906
German companies disestablished in 1993
Companies based in Bremen
Manufacturing companies based in Bremen (state)